Big Lake may refer to:

Communities
Canada
 Big Lake, Edmonton, a neighbourhood in Alberta, Canada
 Big Lake, Nova Scotia
 Big Lakes County, a municipal district in Alberta, Canada

United States
 Big Lake, Alaska
 Big Lake, Minnesota
 Big Lake, Carlton County, Minnesota
 Big Lake Township, Sherburne County, Minnesota
 Big Lake, Missouri
 Big Lake, Texas
 Big Lake, Washington

Lakes
Canada
 Big Lake (Alberta)

New Zealand
 The Big Lake (New Zealand) in Northland Region

Poland
 Big Lake (Poland), a ribbon lake in the Pomeranian Voivodeship

United States
 Big Lake (Arizona)
 Big Lake (Arkansas)
Big Lake in Clay County, Arkansas
Big Lake in Crittenden County, Arkansas
Big Lake in Drew County, Arkansas
Big Lake in Garland County, Arkansas
Big Lake in Pulaski County, Arkansas
Big Lake in St. Francis County, Arkansas
 Big Lake (Iowa)
 Big Lake (Maine)
 Big Lake (Grant County, Minnesota)
 Big Lake (Minnesota-Wisconsin), part of "Pool 4", above Lock and Dam No. 4 on the Mississippi River
 Big Lake (Missouri)
 Big Lake (Montana)
Big Lake in Chouteau County, Montana
Big Lake in Missoula County, Montana
Big Lake in Stillwater County, Montana
Big Lake in Toole County, Montana
 Big Lake (Texas)

Parks
United States
 Big Lake National Wildlife Refuge in Arkansas
 Big Lake State Park in Missouri

Other
 Big Lake (Metro Transit station) in Big Lake, Minnesota
 Big Lake (TV series), Comedy Central television series